Hansen Inlet is an ice-filled inlet between Cape Schlossbach and Cape Cox, along the east coast and near the base of the Antarctic Peninsula. It was mapped by the United States Geological Survey from ground surveys and U.S. Navy air photos, 1961–67, and was named by the Advisory Committee on Antarctic Names for B. Lyle Hansen who, with Herbert T. Ueda, was in charge of the deep-core drilling program at Byrd Station for several seasons, 1966–69.

References

Inlets of Palmer Land